Kalto, or Nahali, is an Indo-Aryan language of India. Kalto is the endonym; the exonym "Nahal" or "Nihal" is disparaging. Because of the name "Nahali", the language has often been confused with Nihali, an apparent language isolate spoken by a neighbouring people with a similar lifestyle.

References

Western Indo-Aryan languages
Languages of India
Endangered languages of India
Endangered Indo-European languages